The 1896 Beloit football team was an American football team that represented Beloit College in the 1896 college football season. Under first-year head coach Charles M. Hollister, Beloit compiled a 2–1–3 record and outscored their opponents 86 or 92 to 24.

Schedule

References

Beloit
Beloit Buccaneers football seasons
Beloit Football